is a Japanese politician of the Liberal Democratic Party, a member of the House of Representatives in the Diet (national legislature). A native of Shimotsuga District, Tochigi and graduate of Nihon University, he was elected to the House of Representatives for the first time in 1996 after serving in the assembly of Tochigi Prefecture for three terms.

In the Cabinet of Prime Minister Taro Aso, appointed on 24 September 2008, Sato was appointed as Chairman of the National Public Safety Commission, Minister of State for Okinawa and Northern Territories Affairs and Minister of State for Disaster Management. This was Sato's first Cabinet appointment.

Sato also briefly served as Minister for Internal Affairs and Communications and Minister of State for Decentralization Reform in Aso's cabinet, from 12 June 2009 to 16 September 2009.

References

External links 
 Official website in Japanese.

1952 births
Living people
Politicians from Tochigi Prefecture
Nihon University alumni
Members of the House of Representatives (Japan)
Ministers of Internal Affairs of Japan
Liberal Democratic Party (Japan) politicians
21st-century Japanese politicians